Pascal Steinwender (born 2 August 1996) is a German professional footballer who plays as a midfielder for FC Teutonia Ottensen.

Career
Steinwender made his debut for SC Paderborn in the first round of the 2020–21 DFB-Pokal on 13 September 2020, coming on as a substitute in the 72nd minute for Kai Pröger against fourth-division side SC Wiedenbrück, which finished as a 5–0 away win. He made his 2. Bundesliga debut the following week on 20 September, coming on as a substitute for Christopher Antwi-Adjei in the 89th minute of Paderborn's away match against Holstein Kiel, which finished as a 1–0 loss.

References

External links
 
 
 
 
 Club statistics

1996 births
Living people
German footballers
Association football midfielders
VfB Oldenburg players
VfL Oldenburg players
SC Paderborn 07 players
VfB Lübeck players
SC Verl players
FC Teutonia Ottensen players
2. Bundesliga players
3. Liga players
Regionalliga players